Roger N. Walsh (born 1946) is an Australian professor of Psychiatry, Philosophy and Anthropology at the University of California, Irvine, in the Department of Psychiatry and Human Behavior, within UCI's College of Medicine. Walsh is respected for his views on psychoactive drugs and altered states of consciousness in relation with the religious/spiritual experience, and has been quoted in the media regarding psychology, spirituality, and the medical effects of meditation.

Education
According to his profile, Walsh received his degrees from the University of Queensland and is involved in six ongoing research areas:
 comparison of different schools of psychology and psychotherapy
 studies of Asian psychologies and philosophies
 the effects of meditation
 transpersonal psychology 
 the psychology of religion
 the psychology of human survival (exploring the psychological causes and consequences of the current global crises).

Selected bibliography

See also
 Shamanism
 Transpersonal psychology

References

Further reading

External links
 
 Roger Walsh at UCI
 
 

Living people
Transpersonal psychologists
University of California, Irvine faculty
Transcendental Meditation researchers
1946 births